Anderson Camp Ground (also known as Brushy Creek Arbor and United Methodist Church) is a historic camp ground in Brushy Creek, in Anderson County, Texas, United States (not to be confused with Brushy Creek in Williamson County, near Austin).

The Arbor is a wooden tent-like structure that was built in 1874.  The Brushy Creek Methodist Church is a one-story Gothic Revival structure that was built in 1894.

The site was added to the National Register of Historic Places in 1982.

The last Methodist camp meetings at the camp ground occurred in the 1930s.

See also

National Register of Historic Places listings in Anderson County, Texas

References

Properties of religious function on the National Register of Historic Places in Texas
Gothic Revival architecture in Texas
1874 establishments in Texas
Buildings and structures in Anderson County, Texas
National Register of Historic Places in Anderson County, Texas
Campgrounds in the United States
United Methodist Church
Methodism in Texas